This is a list of television series and films based on properties of Image Comics. This list includes live action and animated television series and films.

For some of the television series and films below, Image Comics did not begin publishing the associated comic book until after the television series or film had been released. Titles indicated in boldface below are those for which Image or its imprints had published an associated comic book before the television series or film debuted.

Television

Live-action

From Image imprints

Top Cow Productions

Web series

Animated series

From Image imprints

Top Cow Productions

Film

Live-action

From Image imprints
Top Cow Productions

Animated films

Reception

Box office

Critical and public reception

See also
 Image Comics
 List of Image Comics publications
 Image Universe
 List of unproduced Image Comics projects

References

External links
 Image Comics Adaptations on IMDb
 Movies and TV Shows Based on Image Comics

 
Lists of films and television series
Image Comics
Lists of television series based on works